Daniel Kravitz (December 21, 1930 – June 19, 2013) was an American professional baseball player. He was a catcher in Major League Baseball from 1956–60 for the Pittsburgh Pirates and Kansas City Athletics.

Born in Lopez, Pennsylvania, to Eva (Hubiak) and John Kravitz, Danny Kravitz was a reserve catcher for the Pirates from 1956 through 1959, and he also began the 1960 season with the Bucs, but was traded to the Athletics on June 1, 1960 for Hank Foiles and therefore was not with the Pirates during the 1960 World Series. With the Athletics the remainder of the season, Kravitz was part of a catching platoon with Pete Daley and received the most playing time of his career, batting .234 with 4 home runs and 14 runs batted in in 175 at-bats. After the 1960 season, his contract was sold to the Cincinnati Reds. However, he never again played in the major leagues. Kravitz played three more seasons in the minor leagues before retiring.

His first major league home run occurred on May 11, 1956 in the bottom of the ninth inning with the bases loaded and the Pirates trailing the Philadelphia Phillies 5-2. Kravitz' walk-off grand slam gave the Pirates a 6-5 win. His MLB totals included 130 hits, with 22 doubles, seven triples, ten home runs and 54 runs batted in. He hit .236 lifetime in 215 games played.

He died on June 19, 2013.

References

External links

1930 births
2013 deaths
Baseball players from Pennsylvania
Charleston Rebels players
Columbus Jets players
Greenville Pirates players
Hollywood Stars players
Jersey City Jerseys players
Kansas City Athletics players
Major League Baseball catchers
Mayfield Clothiers players
New Orleans Pelicans (baseball) players
People from Sullivan County, Pennsylvania
Pittsburgh Pirates players
Richmond Virginians (minor league) players
Rochester Red Wings players
Waco Pirates players